Schumacher College is a college near Totnes, Devon, England which offers ecology-centred degree programmes, short courses and horticultural programmes. The College is internationally renowned for its experiential approach to learning, encouraging students to start with practice-based skills that support biodiversity and nature connection, and to use these experiences to inform holistic, whole systems thinking and action in response to social and climate issues. Its courses combine personal transformation and collective action through the education of head, heart and hands, bridging the gap between theory and practice, knowledge and experience. In addition to British and European students, it attracts many international students from countries such as Brazil, Japan and the USA.

Description 
The College was co-founded in 1990 by Satish Kumar, John Lane, Stephan Harding and others. The first visiting teacher was Sir James Lovelock, best known for proposing the Gaia Hypothesis. The founders were inspired by E.F. Schumacher, the economist, environmentalist, and development educator, author of Small Is Beautiful. Schumacher College runs holistic education courses for people concerned with issues around ecology and sustainability, in which "students are encouraged to develop a deep, participatory relationship with nature".

The College is committed to reversing the notion that if you are educated you do not need to work the land, and so outside of class, all students are invited to engage hands-on with food growing in the gardens and preparation of meals in the kitchen.

In 2019 the College was also named as a finalist in the Green Gown Awards which celebrate sustainability in education.  The vegetarian College, which has its own cooking team, was selected in the Food and Drink category as over half the food that is eaten by staff and students is grown in the College gardens by volunteers and students on the horticulture programmes.

The College is part of The Dartington Trust and is housed on the 1,200 acre-Dartington Hall estate, northwest of the town of Totnes, Devon. The trust's charitable aims are to use the estate to be a test-bed for a just and sustainable society and it has strong commitment to progressive education, the arts, sustainable horticulture, agroforestry and conservation.

Courses 
In partnership with the University of Plymouth, Schumacher College offers an MA Engaged Ecology, MA Movement, Mind and Ecology, MA Ecological Design Thinking and MA Regenerative Economics. The College also runs a varied programme of residential and online short courses throughout the year and a 6-month horticulture residency.

In 2022, the College launched undergraduate and postgraduate degrees in Regenerative Farming to become the first higher education provider in England to offer agricultural training exclusively focussed on ecologically-minded approaches to food production.

In 2019 the College developed its masters programmes to encompass a blended learning model to allow students to remain primarily in-country and study at the College in intensive two-week blocks.  It also became recognised by the Office for Students, enabling the College to reduce their fees and also for prospective British students to apply for postgraduate loans in order to study.

Current teachers include Kate Raworth, Daniel Wahl, Manda Scott, Martin Shaw, Rupert Sheldrake, Vandana Shiva, Colin Campbell, Jon Young and David Abram.  Former teachers have included Henri Bortoft, Fritjof Capra, Stanislav Grof, Hazel Henderson, James Lovelock, Lynn Margulis, Arne Naess, Brian Goodwin and many others.

See also
Resurgence magazine
California Institute of Integral Studies, California
Schumacher Center for a New Economics, Massachusetts

References

External links

Brian Goodwin interviewed by the Gaia Foundation – Brian Goodwin speaking about Schumacher College (YouTube)

Education in Devon
Environmental education in England
Educational institutions established in 1991
Sustainability organizations
1991 establishments in England